Samuel Hinds may refer to:

Sam Hinds (born 1943), Prime Minister of Guyana, 1999–
Samuel Hinds (bishop) (1793–1872), Bishop of Norwich, 1849–1857
Sam Hinds (baseball) (born 1953), pitcher for the Milwaukee Brewers
Samuel S. Hinds (1875–1948), American actor